Stephan Negru (born 24 July 2002) is an Irish professional footballer who plays for English club Oxford United, as a defender.

Club career
Negru started his career with Lourdes Celtic, before moving to Shelbourne in 2017. Having spent six years playing youth football for Shelbourne, he made his debut in August 2022, playing 90 minutes in a 4–0 FAI Cup win over Bonagee United. He marked his debut in the League of Ireland Premier Division with a goal; the equaliser in a 1–1 draw with Finn Harps.

On 15 December 2022, it was announced that Negru would join EFL League One side Oxford United on 1 January 2023. Upon joining, he stated his intention to progress to the first team as soon as possible. He was named on the bench for Oxford United's FA Cup tie against Arsenal, but did not feature as his side lost 3–0.

International career
Though multiple sources cite his place of birth as Florești, Moldova, Negru himself has stated that he was born in Ireland. He is, however, eligible to represent Moldova as his parents are both Moldovan. He has held discussions with both nations, with Moldova looking to call him up at under-21 level.

Style of play
An aggressive defender, who describes his defending style as "old-school", Negru lists John Terry as a player he models his game on. He is noted for his heading and tackling abilities, and is described as a physical player.

Career statistics

References

2002 births
Living people
Republic of Ireland association footballers
Association football central defenders
League of Ireland players
Shelbourne F.C. players
Oxford United F.C. players
Republic of Ireland expatriate association footballers
Irish expatriate sportspeople in England
Expatriate footballers in England
Irish people of Moldovan descent